Serine/threonine-protein phosphatase 2A 55 kDa regulatory subunit B gamma isoform is an enzyme that in humans is encoded by the PPP2R2C gene.

Function 

The product of this gene belongs to the phosphatase 2 regulatory subunit B family. Protein phosphatase 2 is one of the four major Ser/Thr phosphatases, and it is implicated in the negative control of cell growth and division. It consists of a common heteromeric core enzyme, which is composed of a catalytic subunit and a constant regulatory subunit, that associates with a variety of regulatory subunits. The B regulatory subunit might modulate substrate selectivity and catalytic activity. This gene encodes a gamma isoform of the regulatory subunit B55 subfamily. Alternatively spliced transcript variants encoding different isoforms have been identified.

References

Further reading